Jones Leandro Souza da Silva (born April 29, 1984) is a Brazilian footballer who plays as a forward for Angra dos Reis

References

External links

Jones at ZeroZero

Living people
1984 births
Brazilian footballers
Brazilian expatriate footballers
Association football forwards
Campeonato Brasileiro Série B players
Campeonato Brasileiro Série C players
Campeonato Brasileiro Série D players
Kuwait Premier League players
Primeira Liga players
Volta Redonda FC players
Friburguense Atlético Clube players
Macaé Esporte Futebol Clube players
C.F. Estrela da Amadora players
Esporte Clube Bahia players
Madureira Esporte Clube players
Al-Nasr SC (Kuwait) players
Guarany Sporting Club players
Al-Arabi SC (Kuwait) players
Nova Iguaçu Futebol Clube players
Clube Atlético Metropolitano players
Esporte Clube São Luiz players
Clube Náutico Marcílio Dias players
Associação Desportiva Cabofriense players
Nacional Futebol Clube players
Esporte Clube Democrata players
Operário Futebol Clube (MS) players
Brazilian expatriate sportspeople in Kuwait
Brazilian expatriate sportspeople in Portugal
Expatriate footballers in Kuwait
Expatriate footballers in Portugal